Big Town Czar is a 1939 American mystery film directed by Arthur Lubin starring Barton MacLane and Tom Brown.

Plot
New York City newspaper columnist Ed Sullivan relates the story of crime boss Phil Daley's rise and fall. To the disappointment of his parents but delight of younger brother Danny, crime has paid off handsomely for Phil, but he isn't able to discourage Danny from following in his footsteps.

Danny bribes a prizefighter to take a dive, costing rival gangster Mike Luger a lot of money in bets. Danny ends up dead, and Phil needs to lay low because Luger's looking for him, too. He manages to kill Luger, but ends up arrested, convicted and sentenced to die.

Cast
 Barton MacLane as Phil Daley
 Tom Brown as Danny Daley
 Eve Arden as Susan Warren
 Jack La Rue as Mike Luger
 Horace McMahon as Punchy
 Frank Jenks as Sid Travis
 Ed Sullivan as himself

Production
The film was based on a story by Ed Sullivan. Universal bought it in August 1938. Barton MacLane was cast in December.

Lubin was attached to the film in February 1939.

Filming started 24 February 1939.

Reception
The New York Times called it "a bustling little melodrama."

References

External links
Big Town Czar at IMDb
Big Town Czar at TCMDB

1939 films
1939 mystery films
Films directed by Arthur Lubin
American mystery films
American black-and-white films
Films scored by Frank Skinner
1930s English-language films
1930s American films